Joshard Daus (1947, Hamburg – 26 November 2021) was a German choral conductor. He was noted for revival in performance and recording of the lost passion oratorios of CPE Bach.

References

1947 births
2021 deaths
German choral conductors
German male conductors (music)
20th-century German conductors (music)
20th-century German male musicians
21st-century German conductors (music)
21st-century German male musicians
Musicians from Hamburg